Vostaniyeh-ye Yek (also Romanized as Vostānīyeh-ye Yek) is a village in Darkhoveyn Rural District, in the Central District of Shadegan County, Khuzestan Province, Iran. At the 2006 census, its population was 321, in 46 families.

References 

Populated places in Shadegan County